Airline firms with certificated air carriers, headquartered, directed and operated from Texas

The following is a list of individual passenger, charter, and cargo airlines - U.S. Federal Aviation Administration (FAA) United States Department of Transportation (DOT) Certificated airlines, their parent company firms, consortium firms, private equity firms, or other business operating schemes, doing business as airlines, and headquartered, directed, operated and based within the U.S. State of Texas

List of firms headquartered in the state of Texas

Passenger airlines
 Southwest Airlines,  Dallas Love Field, Love Field area of Dallas, Texas 

 American Airlines,  Dallas/Fort Worth International Airport, Irving, Texas area of Dallas, Texas

Cargo and charter airlines

 Ameristar Air Cargo,  Addison Airport
 Ameristar Jet Charter,  Dallas, Texas
 Berry Aviation,  San Marcos Municipal Airport, San Marcos, Texas
 C&M Airways,  El Paso International Airport, El Paso, Texas (cargo)
 Flexjet  (aka Bombardier Flexjet), Dallas, Texas (Fractional)
 Jet Solutions, L.L.C.,  Richardson, Texas Operates Flexjet 25 fleet.
 Martinaire,  Addison Airport, Addison, Texas

Firms doing business as airlines through investment holdings in DOT/FAA certificated air carriers

American Airlines Group,  Fort Worth, Texas commercial aviation business and airline holding company

 American Airlines 
 Envoy Air,  Fort Worth, Texas
 Piedmont Airlines
 PSA Airlines
 US Airways

Note: American Airlines Group also controls the brand AmericanConnection along with the former certificated airline TWA Airlines LLC, (formerly Trans World Airlines)

List of defunct or merged carriers/firms - headquartered in Texas, but no longer in business

The following is a list of Air Transportation Firms certificated as FAA/DOT Certificated air carriers or doing business as similar type firms in which their primary business is an FAA/DOT Certificated Air Carrier in the conduct of commerce, based and headquartered directed from Texas. This basing and headquarter directing from Texas may be due to business acquisitions, mergers, or buyouts by; airline parent companies, airline holding companies, consortiums, private equity firms, or other strategic investment business schemes, which leave the FAA / DOT airlines air carrier operating certificate with a Texas-based firm.

Former certificated air transportation firms, headquartered in Texas
 Air Alaska Pan Am Air Bridge 
 AirCal
 Air Texas (1968-1970) Fort Worth Meacham International Airport to Austin and Houston
 Amistad Airlines from Del Rio
 ATA Airlines
 Austin Express, (Robert Mueller Municipal Airport then Austin Bergstrom International Airport, Austin, Texas 
 Bar Harbor Airlines originally at Bar Harbor Airport, Trenton, Maine then Houston, Texas.  
 Braniff International Airways, Grapevine, Texas then Dallas, Texas
 Business Express Airlines
 Central Airlines, Fort Worth, Texas
 Conquest Airlines, Robert Mueller Municipal Airport, Austin, Texas
 Continental Airlines
 Continental Micronesia
 Dal Airways 
 Dallas Express Airlines
 Davis Airlines
 Eagle Airlines
 Emerald Air,  Austin, Texas (Bia Cor Holdings Inc., acquired Emerald Air and changed its name to "Braniff III".)
 Essair Airways
 Fort Worth Airlines 
 Hood Airways
 Kitty Hawk Airways
 Kitty Hawk Aircargo, Dallas-Fort Worth International Airport 
 Legend Airlines, Love Field, Dallas, Texas,
 Lone Star Airlines (1960)
 Midway Aviation
 Muse Air, Houston, Texas (became TranStar Airlines)
 Pacific Air Holdings,  Dallas, Texas, airline holding company 
 Pacific Wings,  Dallas, Texas,(commuter airline and operates flights in Hawaii) operates the following brands of the certificated air carrier Pacific Wings which provide Essential Air Services to many small communities through federally subsidized contracts; 
 GeorgiaSkies,  Dallas, Texas (commuter airline which operates flights in Georgia)
 KentuckySkies,  Dallas, Texas (commuter airline which operates flights in Kentucky)
 New Mexico Airlines,  Dallas, Texas (commuter airline which operates flights in New Mexico and West Texas)
 TennesseeSkies,  Dallas, Texas (commuter airline which operates flights in Tennessee. 
 Permian Airlines from Midland to S.A., Del Rio
 Reno Air 
 Rio Airways, Killeen, Texas
 Tejas Airlines (1979–80) Fort Worth Meacham International Airport to Austin, Houston, Corpus Christi, San Antonio, and Laredo 
 Texas Star Airlines
 TranStar Airlines, Houston, Texas 
 Trans-Texas Airways
  Trans World Airlines
 UltraAir
 Wise Airlines from Del Rio to S.A.
 Valiant Airways, Houston, Texas (defunct and never started operations)

Firms with certificated carrier holdings, headquartered in Texas, but no longer in business
 Dalfort Corporation d/b/a 
 Braniff Inc. Dallas, Texas then Orlando, Florida. (partially formed from the assets of Braniff International Airways)
 Exec Express II Inc., d/b/a
 Aspen Mountain Air/Lone Star Airlines Stillwater, Oklahoma then Fort Worth, Texas 
 ExpressJet Holdings
 ExpressJet Airlines  (prior to acquisition by SkyWest Inc.)
 Metro Airlines, Houston, Texas then Dallas-Fort Worth International Airport then Grapevine, Texas (evolved into an airline holding firm with the acquisition of a number of different airlines)
(SS) Air Northeast (Brockway Air), (OY) Aviation Associates (Sunaire), (FH) Chaparral Airlines, (FY) Metro Airlines, (FY) (Metro Airlines) Metro Express II, (HY) Metroflight (Metroflight)
 Texas Air Corporation
 Bar Harbor Airlines, Britt Airways, People Express, Provincetown-Boston Airlines, Rocky Mountain Airways, Texas International Airlines, Eastern Air Lines, Frontier Airlines (1950-1986), New York Air

See also
List of airlines in Alaska
List of airlines in Hawaii

References

Texas
Texas
Airlines
Airlines